The 2019 FIVB Volleyball Men's Nations League was the second edition of the FIVB Volleyball Men's Nations League, an annual international men's volleyball tournament contested by 16 national teams. The competition was held between May and July 2019, and the final round took place in the Credit Union 1 Arena, Chicago, United States. This was the first edition of the World League or the Nations League to have the final round hosted in North America.

Following the results of the 2018 Nations League and 2018 Challenger Cup, South Korea were replaced by debutants Portugal in this edition.

Portugal were the last placed challenger team after the preliminary round and will be replaced by 2019 Challenger Cup winners Slovenia in the 2020 edition.

Russia successfully defended its title, defeating finals hosts, the United States, in the final. Poland claimed the bronze after sweeping Brazil in three straight sets. Matt Anderson from United States named the MVP of the tournament.

Qualification
Sixteen teams qualified for the competition. Twelve of them qualified as core teams which cannot face relegation. Other four teams were selected as challenger teams which could be relegated from the tournament. Portugal replaced South Korea after winning the 2018 Challenger Cup.

Format

Preliminary round
The 16 teams compete in a round-robin format with every core team hosting a pool at least once. The teams are divided into 4 pools of 4 teams at each week and compete five weeks long, for 120 matches. The top five teams after the preliminary round join the hosts of the final round to compete in the final round. The relegation takes into consideration only the 4 challenger teams. The last ranked challenger team will be excluded from the 2020 Nations League. The winners of the 2019 Challenger Cup will qualify for the next edition as a challenger team.

Final round
The six qualified teams play in 2 pools of 3 teams in round-robin. The top 2 teams of each pool qualify for the semifinals. The pool winners play against the runners-up in this round. The semifinals winners advance to compete for the Nations League title. The losers face each other in the third place match.

Pools composition
The overview of pools was released on October 23, 2018.

Preliminary round

Final round

Venues
The list of host cities and venues was announced on 26 March 2019.

Preliminary round

Final round

Competition schedule

Pool standing procedure

 Total number of victories (matches won, matches lost)
 In the event of a tie, the following first tiebreaker will apply: The teams will be ranked by the most points gained per match as follows:
Match won 3–0 or 3–1: 3 points for the winner, 0 points for the loser
Match won 3–2: 2 points for the winner, 1 point for the loser
Match forfeited: 3 points for the winner, 0 points (0–25, 0–25, 0–25) for the loser
 If teams are still tied after examining the number of victories and points gained, then the FIVB will examine the results in order to break the tie in the following order:
Sets quotient: if two or more teams are tied on the number of points gained, they will be ranked by the quotient resulting from the division of the number of all sets won by the number of all sets lost.
Points quotient: if the tie persists based on the sets quotient, the teams will be ranked by the quotient resulting from the division of all points scored by the total of points lost during all sets.
If the tie persists based on the points quotient, the tie will be broken based on the team that won the match of the Round Robin Phase between the tied teams. When the tie in points quotient is between three or more teams, these teams ranked taking into consideration only the matches involving the teams in question.

Squads

The 16 national teams involved in the tournament were required to register a squad of 25 players, which every week's 14-player roster must be selected from. Each country must declare its 14-player roster two days before the start of each week's round-robin competition.

Preliminary round

Ranking

|}
Source: VNL 2019 standings

Week 1

Pool 1
All times are China Standard Time (UTC+08:00).
|}

Pool 2
All times are Argentina Time (UTC−03:00).
|}

Pool 3
All times are Central European Summer Time (UTC+02:00).
|}

Pool 4
All times are Central European Summer Time (UTC+02:00).
|}

Week 2

Pool 5
All times are China Standard Time (UTC+08:00).
|}

Pool 6
All times are Yekaterinburg Time (UTC+05:00).
|}

Pool 7
All times are Japan Standard Time (UTC+09:00).
|}

Pool 8
All times are Eastern Daylight Time (UTC−04:00).
 
 
|}

Week 3

Pool 9
All times are Western European Summer Time (UTC+01:00).
|}

Pool 10
All times are Eastern European Summer Time (UTC+03:00).
|}

Pool 11
All times are Iran Daylight Time (UTC+04:30).
|}

Pool 12
All times are Central European Summer Time (UTC+02:00).
|}

Week 4

Pool 13
All times are Central Daylight Time (UTC−05:00).
|}

Pool 14
All times are Central European Summer Time (UTC+02:00).
|}

Pool 15
All times are Iran Daylight Time (UTC+04:30).
|}

Pool 16
All times are Amazon Time (UTC−04:00).
|}

Week 5

Pool 17
All times are Australian Eastern Standard Time (UTC+10:00).
|}

Pool 18
All times are Brasília Time (UTC−03:00).
|}

Pool 19
All times are Eastern European Summer Time (UTC+03:00).
|}

Pool 20
All times are Central European Summer Time (UTC+02:00).
|}

Final round
All times are Central Daylight Time (UTC−05:00).

Pool play

Pool A

|}

|}

Pool B

|}

|}

Final four

Semifinals
|}

3rd place match
|}

Final
|}

Final standing

Source: VNL 2019 final standings

Awards

Most Valuable Player

Best Setter

Best Outside Spikers

Best Middle Blockers

Best Opposite Spiker

Best Libero

Statistics leaders

Preliminary round

Final round

See also
2019 FIVB Volleyball Women's Nations League
2019 FIVB Volleyball Men's Challenger Cup
2019 FIVB Volleyball Women's Challenger Cup

References

External links
Fédération Internationale de Volleyball – official website
FIVB Volleyball Nations League 2019 – official website

2019
FIVB
Nations League, Men, 2019
2019 in American sports
May 2019 sports events in the United States
June 2019 sports events in the United States
July 2019 sports events in the United States
Volleyball in Chicago
May 2019 sports events in China
June 2019 sports events in China
May 2019 sports events in South America
June 2019 sports events in South America
May 2019 sports events in Poland
June 2019 sports events in Poland
May 2019 sports events in Europe
June 2019 sports events in Europe
June 2019 sports events in Russia
June 2019 sports events in Japan
June 2019 sports events in Canada
June 2019 sports events in Iran
June 2019 sports events in Portugal
June 2019 sports events in France
June 2019 sports events in Australia
June 2019 sports events in Germany